In Person Friday and Saturday Nights at the Blackhawk, Complete, also called The Complete Blackhawk, is a 2003 four-disc collection of the 1961 live performances of the Miles Davis Quintet at the Black Hawk nightclub in San Francisco. These sets, performed with recording in mind, forged new ground for jazz musician Miles Davis, who had never previously been recorded live in a club with his combo. Material from the four sets was first released simultaneously by Columbia Records on two albums in September 1961, titled In Person Friday Nights at the Blackhawk, San Francisco, Volume 1 and In Person Saturday Nights at the Blackhawk, San Francisco, Volume 2. Although those albums were subsequently rereleased several times, the complete sets were not commercially available until Sony Records released a digital mastering of this collection. Simultaneous to this release, the material was made available as two separate double-albums, entitled Friday Night: In Person at the Blackhawk in San Francisco, Complete and Saturday Night: In Person at the Blackhawk in San Francisco, Complete. In conjunction with Sony, Mosaic Records released the 6 LP set.

The complete collection, which included liner notes from the original release by Monterey Jazz Festival co-founder Ralph J. Gleason as well as additional notes by jazz trumpeter Eddie Henderson, was critically and commercially well received. The collection peaked at #9 on Billboard's "Top Jazz Albums" chart.

Critical reception

In its review of the four-disc compilation, The New York Times indicated that the set was "the gold standard for straight-ahead, postwar jazz rhythm". AllMusic, praising the "pristine" sound and "lovely" packaging suggested that "no Davis fan should be without these recordings purchased separately or as a set". The All About Jazz website said that the set was "so fastidiously remastered it sounds live in your living room".

Complete cover imagery 
The original 1961 albums and the 2003 complete reissues (both the 4-disc and 2-disc) displayed a photograph by Leigh Wiener of Davis with his first wife, Frances Taylor, for whom the song "Fran-Dance" was composed. The 2003 restoration of the original cover art came after a number of reissues that used a photo with an atmospheric representation of the exterior of the Black Hawk taken during Davis's performance.

Complete track listing
The track listing for In Person Friday and Saturday Nights at the Blackhawk, Complete reproduces in its entirety the performances of Friday and Saturday nights, April 21 and 22, 1961. Because of space constraints and a desire not to divide sets, the producers of the box set put sessions 1 and 3 together on the first disc, placing the more energetic and lengthier 2nd set on Disc Two. For the two double-disc sets, the track listing for Friday Night: In Person at the Blackhawk in San Francisco, Complete is that of Disc One and Disc Two, below. For Saturday Night: In Person at the Blackhawk in San Francisco, Complete, it is that of Disc Three and Disc Four.

Except where otherwise noted, all songs by Miles Davis:

Disc One
"Oleo" (Sonny Rollins) – 6:56
"No Blues" – 17:13
"Bye Bye (Theme)" – 2:54
"If I Were a Bell" (Frank Henry Loesser) – 12:43
"Fran-Dance" – 7:38
"On Green Dolphin Street" (Bronislau Kaper, Ned Washington) – 12:12
"The Theme" – :44

Disc Two
"All of You" (Cole Porter) – 15:47
"Neo" – 10:18
"I Thought About You" (Johnny Mercer, Jimmy Van Heusen) – 5:04
"Bye Bye Blackbird" (Mort Dixon, Ray Henderson) – 9:46
"Walkin'" (Richard Carpenter) – 14:16
"Love, I've Found You" (Reverend C.L. Moore, Danny Small) – 1:54

Disc Three
"If I Were a Bell" (Loesser) – 12:44
"So What" – 12:14
"No Blues" – 0:27
"On Green Dolphin Street" (Kaper, Washington) – 12:04
"Walkin'" (Carpenter) – 12:24
"'Round Midnight" (Bernie Hanighen, Thelonious Monk, Cootie Williams) – 7:29
"Well, You Needn't" (Monk) – 8:02
"The Theme" – :18

Disc Four
"Autumn Leaves" (Joseph Kosma, Johnny Mercer, Jacques Prévert) – 11:45
"Neo" – 12:29
"Two Bass Hit" (Dizzy Gillespie, John Lewis) – 4:36
"Bye Bye (Theme)" – 3:27
"Love, I've Found You" (Moore, Small) – 1:57
"I Thought About You" (Mercer, VanHeusen) – 5:31
"Some Day My Prince Will Come" (Frank Churchill, Larry Morey) – 9:38
"Softly, as in a Morning Sunrise" (Oscar Hammerstein II, Sigmund Romberg) – 8:41

Original CD editions track listing
Except where otherwise noted, all songs by Miles Davis.

Friday Night

"Walkin'" (Carpenter) – 14:21
"Bye Bye Blackbird" (Dixon, Henderson) – 9:55
"All of You" (Porter) – 15:44
"No Blues" – 8:53
"Bye Bye/The Theme" – 2:42
"Love, I've Found You" (Moore, Small) – 1:54

Saturday Night

"Well, You Needn't" (Monk) – 8:16
"Fran-Dance" – 7:40
"So What" – 12:43
"Oleo" (Rollins) – 5:18
"If I Were a Bell" (Loesser) – 11:10
"Neo" – 12:39

Original 1961 vinyl editions track listing
Except where otherwise noted, all songs by Miles Davis.

Friday Night

Side A
"Walkin'" (Carpenter) – 14:20
"Bye Bye Blackbird" (Dixon, Henderson) – 10:02

Side B
"All of You" (Porter) – 10:30
"No Blues" – 9:09
"Bye Bye/The Theme" – 2:36
"Love, I've Found You" (Moore, Small) – 1:59

Saturday Night

Side A
"Well, You Needn't" (Monk) – 4:42
"Fran-Dance" – 6:06
"So What" – 12:44

Side B
"Oleo" (Rollins) – 5:12
"If I Were a Bell" (Loesser) – 8:40
"Neo" – 12:51

Personnel

Performance

Miles Davis – trumpet
Hank Mobley – tenor saxophone
Wynton Kelly – piano
Paul Chambers – bass
Jimmy Cobb – drums

Production
Bob Belden – reissue producer
Steven Berkowitz – A&R
Stacey Boyle – tape research
Harold Chapman – engineer
Michael Cuscuna – reissue producer
Howard Fritzson – reissue art director
Ralph J. Gleason – liner notes
Eddie Henderson – reissue liner notes
Patti Matheny – artist coordination
Seth Rothstein – project director
Darren Salmieri – artist coordination
Chuck Stewart – photography
Irving Townsend – producer
Mark Unterberger – packaging manager
Leigh Wiener – cover photo
Mark Wilder – audio remixing, audio mastering
Kyle Wofford – artist coordination

Further reading
In Person Friday Night At The Blackhawk, Complete, Volume I review at All About Jazz
In Person Saturday Night At The Blackhawk, Complete, Volume II review at All About Jazz

References

External links
Complete discography information and song samples from Sony's official site

1961 live albums
2003 live albums
2003 compilation albums
Albums produced by Michael Cuscuna
Albums produced by Irving Townsend
Miles Davis compilation albums
Miles Davis live albums
Sony Records compilation albums
Columbia Records live albums
Albums produced by Bob Belden
Albums recorded at the Black Hawk (nightclub)